The City is an American magazine of evangelical Christianity that was established in 2008.

Overview 
The magazine is published three times a year by Robert B. Sloan, the president of Houston Baptist University in Houston, Texas. The editor-in-chief is Benjamin Domenech.

References

External links
 

2008 establishments in Texas
Christian magazines
Houston Christian University
Magazines established in 2008
Magazines published in Texas
Mass media in Houston
Religious magazines published in the United States
Triannual magazines published in the United States